Rowing at the 2013 Southeast Asian Games took place at Ngalike Dam in Naypyidaw, Myanmar between December 14–17.

Medal table

Medal summary

Men

Women

Results

Men's

Single sculls

All times are Myanmar Standard Time (UTC+06:30)

Preliminary
 Qualification: 1–6 → Final (FA)

Final

Double sculls
All times are Myanmar Standard Time (UTC+06:30)

Preliminary
 Qualification: 1–5 → Final (FA)

Final

Coxed eight
All times are Myanmar Standard Time (UTC+06:30)

Preliminary
 Qualification: 1–5 → Final (FA)

Final

Lightweight double sculls
All times are Myanmar Standard Time (UTC+06:30)

Preliminary
 Qualification: 1–6 → Final (FA)

Final

Lightweight coxless four
All times are Myanmar Standard Time (UTC+06:30)

Preliminary
 Qualification: 1–6 → Final (FA)

Final

Women's

Single sculls

All times are Myanmar Standard Time (UTC+06:30)

Preliminary
 Qualification: 1–5 → Final (FA)

Final

Double sculls
All times are Myanmar Standard Time (UTC+06:30)

Preliminary
 Qualification: 1–5 → Final (FA)

Final

Lightweight double sculls
All times are Myanmar Standard Time (UTC+06:30)

Preliminary
 Qualification: 1–5 → Final (FA)

Final

Lightweight coxless four
All times are Myanmar Standard Time (UTC+06:30)

Preliminary
 Qualification: 1–5 → Final (FA)

Final

References

2013 Southeast Asian Games events
Southeast Asian Games
2013